Léopold "Léo" Cavalière is a French basketball player for SIG Strasbourg of the French LNB Pro A.

Club career
In 2013/14, he was crowned French U21 champion with Élan Chalon where he averaged 16.9 points per gane, 7.6 rebounds and 21.2 efficiency over the season. He was named best player in the U21 championship, while making fifteen appearances for the professional team from Pau, when he was not yet 18 years old. 

For the 2018/19 LNB Pro A season, he averaged 7.9 points, 5.6 rebounds and 10.8 efficiency. In the 2019/20 final season with Élan Chalon, he averaged 3.9 points, 4.2 rebounds and 7,5 efficiency as team captain.

In May 2020, at 24 years old, Cavalière joined SIG Strasbourg alongside Yannis Morin. He left Pau-Orthez after playing there for nine years.

3x3 career
As part of Team Paris, Cavalière won the 2020 French Championship alongside teammates Angelo Tsagarakis, Johan Passave-Ducteil and Antoine Eito.

References

External links
Profile at Basketball Champions League
Profile at Eurobasket.com
Profile at basketball-reference

1996 births
Living people
Forwards (basketball)
French men's basketball players
SIG Basket players
Sportspeople from Albi